The 2014 UIM F1 H2O World Championship was the 31st season of Formula 1 Powerboat racing. Alex Carella, driving for the Qatar Team, entered the season as defending triple world champion having successfully defended his world championship for the second year in a row in 2013.

Carella's streak as champion was ended by France's Philippe Chiappe for the CTIC China Team. Chiappe won the final two races of the season in Abu Dhabi and Sharjah, overhauling a ten-point deficit to Carella and eventually won the championship – the first for a French competitor – by eight points. Carella had won the season's first two races in Doha and Liuzhou, before he was disqualified in the third race of the season, which was held in Doha. Third place in the championship went to Carella's teammate Shaun Torrente, who was the only other winner of the 2014 season, in the second Doha event. The results for Carella and Torrente were more than enough for the Qatar Team to win the teams' championship, 40 points clear of the CTIC China Team. The pole position and fastest lap trophies were also taken by Carella, beating Chiappe in both categories.

Teams and drivers

Team and driver changes
As in 2013, there were no major changes to the teams present in the 2014 championship. All nine were once again represented, albeit with some sporting new identities. The most significant of these was the new title sponsorship of Francesco Cantando's team. Known as Singha for many years, thanks to sponsorship from the Thai Singha brand of alcohol, Cantando signed a new deal ensuring his team would be known as the Motorglass F1 Team from 2014. Joining Cantando would once again be Bartek Marszalek who competed in five of the six races in 2013, and fellow Italian Marco Gambi. Whereas Bartek competed for the full year, Gambi was only present at the opening round in Doha. Jonas Andersson's team was the other to undergo a change of identity over the winter as he once again reverted to the Team Sweden name, having been sponsored by Azerbaijan the previous year. For the first race in Qatar, Andersson's team ran with just his own boat, but was joined by 2012 F-4S champion and fellow Swede Jesper Forss from the second race onwards.

At reigning champions the Qatar Team, everything remained the same with Alex Carella and Shaun Torrente again reprising their roles. Similarly, Team Abu Dhabi also retained Thani Al Qamzi and Ahmed Al Hameli for 2014, however they missed both races in Qatar, the first and third races of the season, reportedly due to matters relating to the politics in the region between Qatar and the UAE. CTIC China Team kept 2013 runner-up Philippe Chiappe and their young Chinese driver Xiong Ziwei whilst F1 Atlantic Team also stayed with their line-up of Youssef Al Rubayan and Duarte Benavente.

Sami Seliö and Filip Roms continued the all-Finnish line-up at the Mad Croc team for 2014 whilst Marit Strømøy led the campaign for Team Nautica again, and for 2014 was partnered with fellow Scandinavian, young Swedish driver Erik Stark, replacing the retired Rinaldo Osculati. Caudwell Racing were also back in the championship, campaigning their unique four-stroke engine package, but the team missed the first race in Qatar. An announcement during the summer however revealed their intentions for the rest of the season, with Ivan Brigada again leading the South African team alongside Slovakian Tomas Cermak who was returning to the sport for the first time since 2010. Despite a very popular double points finish for the team at the Grand Prix of the Middle East, with Brigada an excellent seventh, the challenges faced with running heavier four-stroke engines against the well-established and lighter Mercury two-strokes finally took its toll. Caudwell were forced to bow out of the championship prior to the fifth and final race of the season in Sharjah, with 2014 proving to be their most successful year.

Season calendar

A five race calendar made up the 2014 F1 Powerboat season, the smallest in the history of the championship. It began in Doha, Qatar on 15 March and ended in Sharjah, UAE on 19 December. Having pulled out in 2013, Russia did not return to the calendar for 2014, and in addition a Brazilian race was not held, despite its debut in 2013 amidst much fanfare. The round in Ukraine, scheduled for 24 August, was subsequently cancelled in the wake of the country's unrest, and an additional race in Qatar titled the Grand Prix of the Middle East was added to the calendar in Ukraine's place. A second round in China was expected initially, but was later removed from the schedule leaving Liuzhou as China's sole representation in 2014, marking 20 years since the championship first visited the country.

Results and standings
Points were awarded to the top 10 classified finishers. A maximum of two boats per team were eligible for points in the teams' championship.

Drivers standings

Teams standings
Only boats with results eligible for points counting towards the teams' championship are shown here.

References

External links
 The official website of the UIM F1 H2O World Championship
 The official website of the Union Internationale Motonautique

F1 Powerboat World Championship
Formula 1 Powerboat seasons
F1 Powerboat World Championship